A M Turaz (Aas Mohammed Turaz) is an Indian poet, lyricist, and script writer. He has worked in television, music albums and films. He has written the lyrics for a number of Bollywood films including Kudiyon Ka Hai Zamaana of 2007, The Unforgettable of 2009 and Guzaarish of 2010, with the songs "Aayat", "Kabhi Jo Baadal Barse", "Tera Zikr", "Udi" and "Tere Liye Mere Kareem" being the most well known. The musical album "We Indians - Sare Jahan se Achchha Hindustan Hamara" is directed by him. The songs "Ghoomar", "Binte Dil" and "Khalibali" from Padmaavat and Tum Na Aaye from Badla are written by him.

Early life 

A. M. Turaz was born on 19 September 1974 at Sambhaleheda village in Miranpur Muzaffarnagar, Uttar Pradesh. After completing his studies, he came to Mumbai to become a writer.

Career 
Turaz started his career by writing for television in 2005. After writing scripts for soaps as assistant writer, his first assignment in Mumbai was writing lyrics for film Kudiyon Ka Hai Zamana in 2006. This was followed by Jail, Guzarish, Chakravyuh and Jackpot. His songs like "Udi.." and "Kabhi Jo Badal Barse" got lot of attention. Turaz written Chakravyuh song "Tata, Birla, Ambani". On this song producer Prakash Jha got legal notice from Birla and Ambani. He was criticised due to his lyrics in film Chakravyuh.

Filmography
The following films feature lyrics by A. M. Turaz:

Albums

Awards
 Radio Mirchi Award 2015 
 Radio Mirchi Award 2017

Member

Central Board Of Film Certification
 Grameen Mukt Vidhyalayi Shiksha Sansthan(GMVSS),Delhi

Books 
 Lamhe (लम्हे), an anthology of Hindi poetry was published by Poets Corner Group.

References

External links 
 

Living people
Hindi-language writers
Hindi-language lyricists
Indian male songwriters
Hindi-language poets
1981 births